Dmitry Vladimirovich Karakozov (– ) was a Russian political activist and the first revolutionary in the Russian Empire to make an attempt on the life of a tsar. His attempt to assassinate Tsar Alexander II failed and Karakozov was executed.

Early life and studies 
Karakozov was born in the family of a minor Russian noble in Kostroma. He grew to hate his class because all they did was "suck the peasants' blood." He studied at Kazan University 1861–64 and at Moscow State University 1864–66. He was expelled from both which led to depression and a suicide attempt. In early 1866 he became a member of the "revolutionary wing" of the Ishutin Society, founded by his cousin Nikolai Ishutin in Moscow in 1863.

Attempted assassination of Alexander II
In the spring of 1866, Karakozov arrived in St Petersburg to assassinate Alexander II. He circulated his hand-written proclamation called "Друзьям-рабочим" ("To Friends-Workers"), in which he incited people to revolt. He wrote a manifesto to the St Petersburg governor blaming the Tsar for the suffering of the poor:
"I have decided to destroy the evil Tsar, and to die for my beloved people." This note never reached anyone; it was lost in the mail.

It is possible 1866 was the year chosen because of the character of Rakhmetov in What Is to Be Done?. This fictional inspiration of revolutionary youth plans for a revolution to coincide with the apocalypse according to Newton-1866.

On 4 April 1866, Dmitry Karakozov made an unsuccessful attempt on the life of Tsar Alexander II at the gates of the Summer Garden in St Petersburg. As the Tsar was leaving, Dmitry rushed forward to fire. The attempt was thwarted by Ossip Komissarov, a peasant-born hatter's apprentice, who jostled Karakozov's elbow just before the shot was fired. Contemporary monarchists argued that Komissarov's action proved the people's love for their tsar, while contemporary radicals and later Soviet historians argued that Komissarov's involvement in the event was either an accident or an outright government fabrication. Komissarov was ennobled and given a generous allowance, but proved to be an embarrassment to the government due to his boorishness and incoherence and had to be politely removed to the countryside.

Karakozov tried to flee instead of using the second cartridge in his double-barrelled gun, but was easily caught by the guards. He kept one hand in his jacket. It was revealed later to be holding morphine and strychnine to kill himself and prussic acid to disfigure his face. Alexander asked him "What do you want?" "Nothing, nothing," he replied. 

Karakozov was taken to the Peter and Paul Fortress.  He begged for forgiveness and confessed to a priest. The Supreme Criminal Court sentenced him to death by hanging and he was executed in St. Petersburg on 3 September 1866. Of the twenty-six others who were accused of being his accomplices, Ishutin was sentenced to death (this was later commuted as he was about to executed), seven received hard labor, eleven went to prison, and seven were acquitted. As a result of the assassination attempt, the Tsar punished St Petersburg University. Students could no longer form any kind of organisation, no matter how harmless (Ishutin's organisation had officially been to set up sewing cooperatives). They were subjected to constant surveillance and periodic searches.

Karakozov was an inspiration for the radical nihilists Sergei Nechaev and Vera Zasulich.  Alexander II was assassinated in 1881.

Notes
 See, e.g., Adam Bruno Ulam. Prophets and Conspirators in Pre-Revolutionary Russia, New Brunswick, NJ, Transaction Publishers, 1998 (first edition 1977)  pp. 3–5.
 For an analysis of the public perception of the assassination attempt and Komissarov's actions, see Richard S. Wortman.

Further reading
 Claudia Verhoeven. The Odd Man Karakozov: Imperial Russia, Modernity and the Birth of Terrorism, Ithaca: Cornell University Press, 2009,

References

Citations

Sources

External links

1840 births
1866 deaths
19th-century executions by the Russian Empire
Executed people from Kostroma Oblast
Executed people from the Russian Empire
Failed regicides
Moscow State University alumni
Narodniks
People executed for attempted murder
People executed by the Russian Empire by hanging
People from Kostroma
Assassins from the Russian Empire
Russian nihilists
Nobility from the Russian Empire
Revolutionaries from the Russian Empire